Jonahmae Panen Pacala also known by her pseudonym as Jonaxx, is a Filipino author, born on 23 January 1991 and hailing from Cagayan de Oro, Philippines. She is currently the most followed Wattpad author worldwide with over 5 million followers and is widely known as the "Wattpad Queen" and "Pop Fiction Queen". Jonaxx is one of the all-time best-selling authors in the Philippines. In 2017, she has published around 150,000 copies of her books and was featured in Yes! magazine. Her best works include Pop Fiction's Mapapansin Kaya?, Every Beast Needs A Beauty, and the Baka Sakali Trilogy— some of which made it to National Book Store's local fiction bestseller list.

Education 
Jonaxx attended the Xavier University – Ateneo de Cagayan, where she graduated with a bachelor's degree in early childhood education in 2011.

Career 

Jonaxx joined the online teen forum TeenTalk on the website candymag.com (the online affiliate of Candy magazine, published by Summit Media), and she posted her work on “Creative Corner,” a TeenTalk subsection dedicated to poems and stories way back 2003.

In November 2012, acting on an old tip from one of her readers, Jonaxx signed up on the online writing platform Wattpad to call out a user who had plagiarized one of her works. She then became the first Filipino writer to be verified by Wattpad and was followed by Allen Lau on the platform.

In March 2017, she ended her Pop Fiction run with the release of an entire trilogy, the Baka Sakali Trilogy, which was launched in one of the biggest book signing events by a single author by a local publisher. Summit Books held the book signing in Filoil Flying V Arena.

In December 2018, the Alegria Boys Boxed Set was launched under Jonaxx’s own imprint Majesty Press. It was held in the Filoil Flying V Arena. Two years after the launch, MPress’ Alegria Boys Boxed Set remains as one of the bestselling books.

In November 2019, Cristina Pantoja-Hidalgo acknowledged the natural talent of writers like Jonaxx in her speech at the 69th Carlos Palanca Memorial Awards for Literature, saying that the author is “so big that the company has created an imprint just for her".

In September 2020, Jonaxx was included in a module as one of the Tanyag na Manunulat in the Philippines together with the national hero José Rizal.

In March 2021, the acclaimed poet-writer Jerry Gracio, named Jonaxx as one of the most influential writers over the past 10 years in the Philippines together with Bob Ong, Conchitina Cruz, and Allan Popa.

On April 24, 2022, Jonaxx was awarded the Silver Play Button for surpassing 100,000 subscribers on YouTube. As of March 2023, her TikTok hashtag – #jonaxx has exceeded over 800 million combined views, despite not having an official account on the platform.

Jonaxx has written over 40 books and 17 books were published in the mainstream. Her works are written in Taglish and have inspired fierce loyalty and great dedication among fans, who are one of the most active in the local romance novel scene. Due to her immense popularity, her stories have also been published and sold at bookstores. Since their publication, her books have consistently ranked among the Top 10 bestselling local novels at the National Book Store. On Summit Books’ Pop Fiction, Sizzle, and  Majesty Press, she has published stories from the Elizalde Brothers Series (Heartless and Worthless), the Good Lips Series (Every Beast Needs A Beauty), the Art of Seduction Series (Training To Love and Why Do You Hate Me?), the Jimenez Cousin Series (Chase and Hearts), the Alegria Boys Series (Mapapansin Kaya?, Baka Sakali, End This War, and Tale From Alegria), and the Azucarera de Altagracia Series (Against The Heart, Getting To You, Hold Me Close, and Never Get Past Him). 

She has also self-published her stories from the Montefalco Series (Until Trilogy – Until He Was Gone, Until He Returned, Until Forever), the Good Lips Series (One Night, One Lie and Give In To You), 24 Signs of Summer, and the Costa Leona Series (Scorching Love, Waves of Memories, Island of Fire, Blown by the Wind, What Lies Beneath the Sand, Sands of Time, Ruling the Wild Waves, and Sunburned Heart).

Other very popular series and stories by Jonaxx are the Azucarera Series, Del Fierro Series, Alegria Girls Series, Nuevo Series, After The Last Series, City of Embers Series, Rara Avis Series, Viejo Series, and many more to come which can be read in her own app.

Bibliography

After The Last Series 
Hushed Thunder

Alegria Boys Series 
Baka Sakali Trilogy
Mapapansin Kaya?
End This War

Alegria Girls Series 
Whipped: Entice
Ripped: Freya
Tripped: Lilienne

Art of Seduction Series 
Training To Love
Why Do You Hate Me?

Azucarera Series 
Against The Heart
Getting To You
Hold Me Close

City of Embers Series 
When The Parade Ends

Costa Leona Series 
Scorching Love
Waves of Memories
Island of Fire
Blown by the Wind
What Lies Beneath the Sand
Sands of Time
Ruling the Wild Waves
Sunburned Heart
Whispers of the Wind
Love in the Dark
Kissing the Dust
Sweet Flames of Vengeance
After the Chains
The Sun's Heartbeat

Del Fierro Series 
One Rebellious Night
The Beast in Paradise
Giving You Wildfire

Elizalde Brothers Series 
Heartless
Worthless

Good Lips Series 
Every Beast Needs A Beauty
One Night, One Lie
Give In To You

Jimenez Cousins Series 
Invisible Man
No Perfect Prince
Chase and Hearts

Montefalco Series 
Until Trilogy
To Stay
To Fall Again
To Be With You
To Get Over You
From Afar
Stay Forever

Nuevo Series 
From the Start
It Was You
Till the Very End

One Shot 
Nung Na-realize Mo Na

Rara Avis Series 
Shelter in Your Fingertips
A Call to Your Arms

Stand Alone Stories 
Downfall Chronicles
Just That
24 Signs of Summer
Remembering Summer

Viejo Series 
Light A Candle
In Front of the Mirror
At Midnight

Majesty Press 
In July 2017, Jonaxx launched her own imprint, Majesty Press (MPress) under Summit Media. Majesty Press is a publisher of Jonaxx stories. It publishes the unabridged, uncut versions of her stories— some of which contain new and special content written exclusively for the MPress books imprint. In April 2020, Majesty Press released eBooks for the published books under MPress on Shopify.  In April 2022, all of the books published under MPress were made available on Google Play Books.

Jonaxx Stories app 
On July 26, 2020, Jonaxx launched her own free online reading application, Jonaxx Stories, on IOS, and on August 7, 2020, it was released on Android. On February 23, 2021, Jonaxx Stories surpassed one million downloads on Google Play Store. On April 15, 2022, Jonaxx Stories ranked no. 2 in the Top Free Books iPhone Apps in  App Store in the Philippines, behind Wattpad.

Awards and Recognitions 

 Most Followed Wattpad Author Worldwide
 The Best-Selling Author
 The Most Influential Writer/Author
 One Of The Asian Popular Writers
 Tanyag Na Manunulat
Jaw Dropping Plot Twist Author
Pop Fiction Queen
 Writer of the Year (2013)
 Most Active Writer Of the Year (2013)
 Best Romance Story (2013) – Chase and Hearts
 Best Teen Fiction Story – Invisible Man
 Best Story of the Year (2013) – Baka Sakali
 Best Romance Story (2013) – Baka Sakali
 Best Non Teen Fiction Story (2013) – Baka Sakali
 Summit Media Queen (2014)
 Gawad Kasulatan Awardee (2014)
 Filipino Readers Choice Award for Romance in Filipino (2015) – Heartless
 Best General Fiction Story – Heartless
 MyWattysChoice (2015) – To Stay
 People's Choice Award (2015) – Until Trilogy
 Best Romance Story – Until Trilogy
 Watty's People Choice Award – Tripped
 Best Writer in Watty's Best of the Best Awards (2017)
 Best International Story by The Fiction Awards (2019) – Until He Was Gone

References

External links 
 Official Website

1991 births
Living people
Filipino women writers
Filipino writers
People from Cagayan de Oro
Xavier University – Ateneo de Cagayan alumni